Marco Bülow (born 14 June 1971) is a German journalist and politician who has served as a member of the Bundestag from the state of North Rhine-Westphalia from 2002 to 2021. Since 2020, he is a member of Die PARTEI. Formerly, he was a member of the Social Democratic Party (SPD) between 1992 and 2018.

Political career
Bülow has been a member of the German Bundestag since the 2002 federal elections, representing Dortmund I. He serves on the Committee of the Environment, Nature Conservation, Building and Nuclear Safety. He left the SPD in 2018 and has joined the party Die PARTEI in November 2020 as their first ever member in the Bundestag.

Other activities
 Bundesverband Bioenergie (BBE), Member of the Advisory Board
 Energy Watch Group (EWG), Member
 German Renewable Energy Federation (BEE), Member of the Parliamentary Advisory Board (-2014)
 Institut Solidarische Moderne (ISM), Member of the Board of Trustees
 Amnesty International, Member
 German United Services Trade Union (ver.di), Member

References

External links 
  
 Bundestag biography 

1971 births
Living people
Politicians from Dortmund
Members of the Bundestag for North Rhine-Westphalia
Aufstehen
Members of the Bundestag 2017–2021
Members of the Bundestag 2013–2017
Members of the Bundestag 2009–2013
Members of the Bundestag 2005–2009
Members of the Bundestag 2002–2005
Members of the Bundestag for the Social Democratic Party of Germany